Shreya Ghoshal (born 12 March 1984) is an Indian playback singer. She sings in Hindi, Malayalam, Tamil, Telugu, kannada, Marathi, Gujarati, Bengali, Assamese, Nepali, Oriya, Bhojpuri, Punjabi and Tulu languages. Ghoshal's career began when she won the Sa Re Ga Ma Pa contest as an adult. Her Bollywood playback singing career began with Sanjay Leela Bhansali's Devdas, for which she received her first National Film Award for Best Female Playback Singer along with Filmfare Award for Best Female Playback Singer and Filmfare RD Burman Award for New Music Talent. She sang more than 102 songs in Malayalam.

Film Songs 
She sang more than 102 Film songs in Malayalam.

2007

2009

2010

2011

2012

2013

2014

2015

2016

2017

2018

2019

2021

2022

Non-Film Songs

2009

2013

2014

2015

References

External links 
 List of Malayalam songs by Shreya Ghoshal at MalayalaSangeetham
 Shreya Ghoshal's Profile at MalayalaChalachithram
 
 
 

Malayalam
Ghoshal, Shreya
Ghoshal, Shreya